Mattia Compagnon (born 6 November 2001) is an Italian professional footballer who plays as a winger for  club Juventus Next Gen.

Career

Early career 
Compagnon started his career at Aurora Buonacquisto, his hometown team, before moving to Moimacco, where he remained for four years.

Compagnon joined Udinese's youth setup aged 11. In 2018–19, Compagnon scored five goals in the Campionato Primavera 1; the following season, he scored eight in 18 games in the Campionato Primavera 2. Compagnon was first called up to the first team on 19 July 2020, in a Serie A game against Napoli. He made five bench appearances in 2019–20, without featuring for Udinese.

Potenza 
On 11 September 2020, Compagnon joined Serie C side Potenza on loan. He made his debut on 23 September, coming on as a substitute in a 2–0 Coppa Italia defeat to Triestina. Compagnon's league debut came on 24 October; he was subbed on in the 79th minute in a 2–1 defeat to Virtus Francavilla.

On 18 November, Compagnon played his first game as a starter in a 1–0 defeat to Palermo. He scored his first professional goal on 23 December, helping his side beat Monopoli 1–0. Compagnon scored one goal and made three assists in 12 Serie C games in the first half of the season.

Juventus Next Gen 
On 2 February 2021, Compagnon joined Serie C club Juventus U23 – the reserve team of Juventus – on loan with an option to buy. He made his debut on 7 February, scoring a goal as a substitute against Livorno in a 6–0 win.

On 24 July 2021, he joined Juventus permanently. On 15 September, Compagnon failed a penalty in a 3–2 Coppa Italia Serie C win against Feralpisalò in injury time; in that game he had also scored a goal in the 67th minute. On 13 February 2022, Compagnon scored a brace in two minutes in the match won 3–0 against Mantova. On 4 May, Compagnon scored the 57th-minute winning goal in Juventus U23's 1–0 win to Pro Vercelli during the second round of the promotion play-offs, allowing his side to access the further round.

On 9 August, he renewed with Juventus until 2026. In September, Compagnon was given the number 10 jersey for Juventus Next Gen (whose name had been changed from Juventus U23). He missed the start of the new season due to a low-grade excision of the adductor region of the right thigh. On 28 October, Compagnon received his first call up by first-team coach Massimiliano Allegri for Lecce–Juventus, played the following day.

Style of play 
Compagnon is a left-footed winger who has good acceleration.

Career statistics

Club

References

Notelist

External links 
 
 

2001 births
Living people
Sportspeople from Udine
Footballers from Friuli Venezia Giulia
Italian footballers
Association football wingers
Association football midfielders
Serie C players
Udinese Calcio players
Potenza Calcio players
Juventus Next Gen players